Kati Murutar ( Vasar, 1988-2010 Murutar, 2010-2011 Murdmaa, 2011-2020 Kati Saara Vatmann, from 2020 Kati Saara Borodina; born on 21 March 1967) is an Estonian prose writer, screenwriter and journalist.

Murutar was born in Tallinn to opera tenor  and Ille Vasar. Her older half-brother was the artist Aarne Vasar (:et) and her younger brother is opera baritone . She is one of the authors of television series Õnne 13 (partly based on her book series Õnne tänava lood I-III).

Works

 "Naisena sündinud". Pärnu: Perona 1992. 214 pp
 "Mina ise ju!" Tartu: Elmatar 1993. 253 pp
 "Abitu". Tallinn: Faatum 1995. 236 pp
 "Õnne tänava lood I-III". Tartu: Elmatar 1997
 "Mustlasena sündinud". Tartu: Elmatar 1999
 "Igavestel alleedel". Tallinn: Ilo 2003. 421 pp
 "Eedeni aed". Tallinn: Eesti Ekspress 2007. 256 pp

References

Living people
1967 births
Estonian screenwriters
Estonian women novelists
Estonian dramatists and playwrights
20th-century Estonian women writers
21st-century Estonian women writers
University of Tartu alumni
Writers from Tallinn